Ghana competed at the 2018 Commonwealth Games in the Gold Coast, Australia from April 4 to April 15, 2018. It was Ghana's 16th appearance at the Commonwealth Games.

Boxer Abdul Omar was the country's flag bearer during the opening ceremony.

Medalists

Competitors
The following is the list of number of competitors participating at the Games per sport/discipline.

Athletics

Men
Track & road events

Combined events – Decathlon

Women
Track & road events

Field events

Combined events – Heptathlon

Badminton

Ghana participated with eight athletes (four men and four women)

Singles

Doubles

Mixed team

Roster

Stella Amasah
Grace Atipaka
Abraham Ayittey
Michael Baah
Emmanuel Donkor
Gifty Mensah
Eyram Migbodzi
Daniel Sam

Pool D

Boxing

Ghana participated with a team of 7 athletes (7 men)

Men

Cycling

Ghana participated with 5 athletes (5 men).

Road
Men

Track
Sprint

Time trial

Hockey

Ghana qualified a women's [field] hockey team of 18 athletes, after being ranked in the top nine in the Commonwealth (minus the host nation Australia). This will mark the country's Commonwealth debut in the sport.

Women's tournament

Roster

Juwaila Acquah
Janet Adampa
Bennedicta Adjei
Lydia Afriyie
Cecilia Amoako
Mavis Ampem-Darkoa
Bridget Azumah
Mavis Berko
Serwaa Boakye
Ernestina Coffie
Emelia Fosuaa
Vivian Narkuor
Elizabeth Opoku
Roberta Owusu
Martha Safoa
Adizatu Sulemana
Nafisatu Umaru
Deborah Whyte

Pool B

Ninth and tenth place

Shooting

Ghana participated with 2 athletes (1 man and 1 woman).

Swimming

Ghana participated with 4 athletes (2 men and 2 women).

Men

Women

Table tennis

Ghana participated with 6 athletes (4 men and 2 women).

Singles

Doubles

Team

Weightlifting

Ghana participated with 4 athletes (3 men and 1 woman).

See also
Ghana at the 2018 Winter Olympics

References

Nations at the 2018 Commonwealth Games
Ghana at the Commonwealth Games
2018 in Ghanaian sport